The High German Evangelical Reformed Church, also known as Zion Reformed and Zion United Church of Christ, is an historic Evangelical and Reformed church, which is located at 622 West Hamilton Street in Allentown, Pennsylvania in the Lehigh Valley region of eastern Pennsylvania. 

This church played a key role during the American Revolution because it was the site chosen to hide and protect the Liberty Bell from seizure during the British Army's occupation of Philadelphia between September 1777 and June 1778.

Today, the church is also home to the Liberty Bell Museum, which was established to honor the role that Allentown and Lehigh Valley-area American patriots played in successfully guarding America's national symbol of freedom.

History
Initially built on its present-day site in Allentown, Pennsylvania as a log structure in 1762, the original High German Evangelical Reformed Church building was replaced in 1773 with a simple brick structure, which was designed in a vernacular federal style and erected a few yards north of the first log church's location.

Liberty Bell's hiding
In September 1777, as American patriots prepared for a British Army attack on the colonial capital of Philadelphia, the Liberty Bell and other bells in Philadelphia were ordered taken down and then hastily transported to present-day Allentown (then called Northampton Towne), where they were successfully hidden under the church's floor boards until June 1778 when the British abandoned Philadelphia. 

In 1838, when Zion Reformed was enlarged, contractors may have incorporated the 1762 structure into the walls of the current building's boiler room. The building was then enlarged further between 1886 and 1888 via gothic revival-style improvements made by architect Lewis Jacoby.

In 1983, the church was added to the National Register of Historic Places.

Liberty Bell Museum
The Liberty Bell Museum, which commemorates the Liberty Bell's hiding in 1777, is located in the church's basement and is open to visitors.

See also
 List of historic places in Allentown, Pennsylvania

References

External links
Official website
Official Liberty Bell Museum website

1777 in the United States
Churches on the National Register of Historic Places in Pennsylvania
Gothic Revival church buildings in Pennsylvania
Churches completed in 1888
Churches in Lehigh County, Pennsylvania
United Church of Christ churches in Pennsylvania
History of Allentown, Pennsylvania
Buildings and structures in Allentown, Pennsylvania
National Register of Historic Places in Lehigh County, Pennsylvania
Pennsylvania in the American Revolution